Ryo Ogihara is a Japanese curler. He currently skips a team out of Karuizawa on the World Curling Tour.

As a junior curler, he skipped the Japanese team of Tetsuro Shimizu, Yuki Sakamoto and Yuta Matsumura to a bronze medal finish at the 2007 Pacific Junior Curling Championships. The following year, Ogihara played second for the Japanese team at the 2008 Pacific Juniors. The team, skipped by Sakamoto would win the silver medal.

Ogihara was also the alternate for the Japanese team at the 2007 Winter Universiade. The team, skipped by Yusuke Morozumi finished 5th and Ogihara would play in five games for the team.

On the World Curling Tour, Ogihara has won two events, the 2016 Minebea Cup and the 2019 Morioka City Men's Memorial Cup.

In addition to playing, Ogihara was the coach of the Japanese women's team at the 2019 Winter Universiade.

References

External links
 

Living people
Japanese male curlers
Competitors at the 2007 Winter Universiade
Japanese curling coaches
1987 births